Kenias Tembo (born 15 March 1955) is a Zimbabwean long-distance runner. He competed in the men's 10,000 metres at the 1980 Summer Olympics.

References

1955 births
Living people
Athletes (track and field) at the 1980 Summer Olympics
Zimbabwean male long-distance runners
Olympic athletes of Zimbabwe
Place of birth missing (living people)